Lassi is a village in Hiiumaa Parish, Hiiu County, Estonia, located on the southern part of Hiiumaa island. It has a population of 44 (as of 1 January 2000).

References

Villages in Hiiu County